Mid Fearn Halt was a small railway station in Mid Fearn in Ross-shire in Scotland, it was located on the Inverness and Ross-shire railway between Tain and Ardgay. The station was short lived having opened in 1864 then closed in 1865, then reopened in 1926 as Mid Fearn Platform, only to later close in 1928.

References 

Disused railway stations in Ross and Cromarty
Former Highland Railway stations
Railway stations in Great Britain opened in 1864
Railway stations in Great Britain closed in 1865
Railway stations in Great Britain opened in 1926
Railway stations in Great Britain closed in 1928